Paco, formerly known as Dilao, is a district of Manila, Philippines located south of the Pasig River, and San Miguel, west of Santa Ana, southwest of Pandacan, north of Malate, northwest of San Andres Bukid, and east of Ermita. According to the 2020 census, it has a population of 79,839 people.

History

Paco was known as Dilao because of the Amaryllis plants that were once plentiful in this district.  Dilao or dilaw is a Tagalog word for the color yellow. Although, some sources say, it was named Dilao or "Yellow Plaza" by the Spanish settlers because of the Japanese migrants who lived there, describing their physiognomy. Spanish Franciscan missionaries founded the town of Paco as early as 1580. It was a town part of the province of Tondo, which was later renamed Manila in 1859, until 1901.

The name Dilao was used until 1791. The name San Fernando was added, making it San Fernando de Dilao. In the 19th century, the town of San Fernando de Dilao was given the nickname of Paco (which means Francisco). Paco, along with Sampaloc, Santa Ana, San Juan del Monte, and San Pedro de Macati became the second largest district to become part of Manila. It came to be known as Paco de Dilao and eventually Paco, as it is known today.

The Japanese had established an enclave quite early or Nihonmachi at Dilao, a suburb of Manila, where they numbered between 300 and 400 in 1593. A statue of Takayama can be found there. In 1603, during the Sangley rebellion, they numbered 1,500 and 3,000 in 1606. The Franciscan friar Luis Sotelo was involved in the support of the Dilao enclave between 1600 and 1608.

The Japanese led an abortive rebellion in Dilao against the Spanish in 1606–1607. Their numbers rose again during the interdiction of Christianity by Tokugawa Ieyasu in 1614, when 300 Japanese Christian refugees under Takayama Ukon settled in the Philippines. As population assimilated to native population, numbers dimmed. However, there are today around 200,000 recorded Japanese people in the Philippines, based on modern day immigrants' records distinct from the population of colonial era immigrants which assimilated to the native population.

Paco was incorporated as a district of the newly chartered city of Manila in 1901, thus reducing from its independent municipality status.

From 1907 to 1949, Paco was part of the 2nd congressional district of Manila. Reapportionment of districts made Paco part of the 4th district from 1949 to 1972. In the 1987 Constitution, Paco was split to the 5th and 6th congressional districts, with the former covering the southern half and the latter covering the northern areas.

List of Barangays 

Fifth District

Southern Paco

Sixth District

Northern Paco

Landmarks

The San Fernando de Dilao Church is a Roman Catholic parish church that served as the temporary pro-cathedral of the Roman Catholic Archdiocese of Manila from 2012 to 2014 during the renovations of Manila Cathedral in Intramuros.

A Sikh Temple and Unilever Philippines is located on United Nations Avenue. Unilever was moved to Bonifacio Global City, Taguig. There is a ten-minute walk away is a Hindu temple at Looban Street. There are car dealers like Toyota, Ford, Hyundai, Nissan, and Honda. Presently, Dilao is traversed by Quirino Avenue. A loop road from Quirino Avenue is named Plaza Dilao to commemorate the once flourishing Japanese and the Japanese-Filipino communities and districts there in Japantown in Manila.

Paco Park, was a former municipal cemetery of the old city of Manila, and once contained the remains of Philippine national hero, José Rizal and the GOMBURZA priests.

The Osmeña Highway starts in this district and it leads to Calabarzon region via South Luzon Expressway that starts in Magallanes Interchange, Makati.

Philippine National Railways owns and operates the Paco railway station.

The Paco Public Market located along the edge of Estero de Paco was designed by William Parsons and built in 1911.

Schools include the Colegio de la Inmaculada Concepcion de la Concordia, or simple Concordia College, and the Paco Catholic School.

See also
 Nihonmachi
 Dom Justo Takayama

References

External links

 
Districts of Manila
1580 establishments in the Philippines